Jimmy Santos is an Afro-Uruguayan popular vocalist of candombe, jazz and rock. Jimmy has lived in Argentina since 1976 and is part of the black population in Argentina. He also plays the drums. In 1977 he joined Raíces. He has a good relationship with Andrés Calamaro the Argentine singer, guitarist and pianist, and works with him.

Jimmy Santos with Raíces discography

References

External links

Jimmy Santos – Esto es candombe

Living people
Uruguayan emigrants to Argentina
Argentine musicians
Uruguayan musicians
Year of birth missing (living people)